Nelly Antoinette Byl (25 March 1919 – 30 November 2011) was a Belgian songwriter, who wrote over 2000 songs in Dutch and other languages.

Byl was born in Molenbeek-Saint-Jean.  She wrote some 200 songs for Will Tura, as well as songs for artists such as Conny Vandenbos ("Raak me niet aan", 1963) and the Gibson Brothers ("Que Sera Mi Vida", 1980).

Nelly Byl died in Uccle, aged 92.

References

1919 births
2011 deaths
Belgian songwriters
People from Molenbeek-Saint-Jean